Shelbyville is a city in and the county seat of Shelby County, Illinois, United States, along the Kaskaskia River.  As of the 2020 census, the population was at 4,674. HSHS Good Shepherd Hospital, located in town, is the county's only hospital.  Shelbyville is also home to Chautauqua Auditorium.

History
Shelbyville is the home of Josephine Garis Cochran who invented one of the first mechanical dishwashers ever built in 1886. It was exhibited at the 1893 Chicago Columbian Exposition, where it won "the highest award."
Another Shelbyville invention, the first commercial pick-up baler, was designed and developed by Raymore McDonald, as conceived and financed by Horace M. Tallman and his two sons, Leslie and Gentry. These balers were marketed for many years by the Ann Arbor Machine Company of Shelbyville. This concept of field processing of farm forages made a significant contribution to the efficiency and economy of harvesting in the world's agriculture. This basic field pick-up mechanism has been used in over 15 million balers.  The American Society of Agricultural and Biological Engineers designated Shelbyville as an historical landmark of agricultural engineering, of which there are only 47 in the entire United States.  Mr. Tallman's home has been restored and is on the National Register of Historic Places.  Located on West Main Street, the Tallman home is currently part of the Shelby Inn.

Geography
Shelbyville is located at  (39.408142, -88.799730).

Shelbyville was founded in 1827 and named in honor of Isaac Shelby, hero of the Revolutionary War and Governor of Kentucky.  The history of Shelbyville begins with Barnett Bone, a Tennessean who, in 1835, built a log cabin along the Kaskaskia River.  His cabin eventually became the county courthouse.  The first businesses were blacksmith shops, a general store and stage coach stop, and a grist mill.

The terminal moraine of the Wisconsin Glacier is located  near Shelbyville. This is referred to as the Shelbyville Moraine.

Climate

Demographics

As of the census of 2010, there were 4,700 people, 2,093 households, and 1,345(?) families residing in the city. There were 2,308 housing units at an average density of 619.9(?) per square mile (239.1/km)(?). The racial makeup of the city was 98.26% White, 0.34% African American, 0.26% Native American, 0.32% Asian, 0.06% Pacific Islander, 0.28% from other races, and 0.49% from two or more races. Hispanic or Latino of any race were 1.34% of the population.

There were 2,093 households, out of which 27.6% had children under the age of 18 living with them, 49.6% were married couples living together, 9.6% had a female householder with no husband present, and 36.9% were non-families. 33.1% of all households were made up of individuals, and 16.9% had someone living alone who was 65 years of age or older. The average household size was 2.28 and the average family size was 2.89.

In the city, the population was spread out, with 23.0% under the age of 18, 8.3% from 18 to 24, 25.3% from 25 to 44, 21.5% from 45 to 64, and 21.9% who were 65 years of age or older. The median age was 40 years. For every 100 females, there were 91.2 males. For every 100 females age 18 and over, there were 87.6 males.

The median income for a household in the city was $32,458, and the median income for a family was $39,205. Males had a median income of $31,477 versus $18,710 for females. The per capita income for the city was $17,596. About 6.2% of families and 9.9% of the population were below the poverty line, including 10.2% of those under age 18 and 13.8% of those age 65 or over.

Lake Shelbyville Dam
The Kaskaskia River has been dammed where it breaches the Shelbyville Moraine, forming Lake Shelbyville.

The Army Corps of Engineers broke ground on the dam in 1963, and construction was completed in the early summer of 1970. Tours of the dam are given at 3 P.M. Saturdays and Sundays.

Notable people 

 George A. Bowman  (1890–1957), Wisconsin State Assembly member
 Orval Caldwell (1895–1972), painter and one-time president of the Art Institute of Chicago
 George D. Chafee (1839–1927), Illinois state legislator and lawyer
 Josephine Cochran (1839–1913), invented and patented the dishwasher (1886)
 Augusta Cottlow (1878–1954), concert pianist
 Jesse Monroe Donaldson (1895–1970), served as Postmaster General of the United States (1947–1953)
 Howland J. Hamlin  (1850–1909), served as Illinois Attorney General (1901–1905)
 Samuel Wheeler Moulton (1821–1905), Illinois politician, Congressman, considered the father of public education in Illinois, lived in Shelbyville (1849–1905)
 Robert Marshall Root (1863–1937), noted Midwestern tonalist and impressionist painter
 Anthony Thornton (1814–1904), state representative (1851–1852), Congressman (1865–1867) and Supreme Court of Illinois justice  (1870–1873); debated Abraham Lincoln in Shelbyville (1856)

Education 

Shelbyville is home to Shelbyville Community Unit School District 4 which also includes Shelbyville High School and was once home to Sparks College, a business trade school, founded in 1908 that closed in 2009.

References

External links 
 https://web.archive.org/web/20060715004624/http://www.mvs.usace.army.mil/Shelbyville/lakeshelbyville.htm
 http://www.lakeshelbyville.com

Populated places established in 1827
Cities in Illinois
Cities in Shelby County, Illinois
County seats in Illinois
1827 establishments in Illinois